The Tajikistan women's national volleyball team is the national women's volleyball team of Tajikistan.

Most notable Tajikistan-born female volleyballer is Angelina Grün who formerly represented Germany.

Tournament records

Asian Championship

Asian Games

Asian Cup

References

National, Women's
National women's volleyball teams
Volleyball